Víctor López may refer to:

 Víctor Manuel Bautista López (born 1958), Mexican politician
 Víctor López Morón (born 1968), Spanish tennis player
 Víctor López (footballer, born 1971), Uruguayan footballer
 Víctor Varela López (born 1973), Mexican politician
 Víctor López (footballer, born 1978), Argentine footballer
 Víctor David López (born 1987), Argentine footballer
 Víctor López (footballer, born 1997), Spanish footballer